"You're So Right for Me" is a song by English hard rock band Rooster. Written by vocalist Nick Atkinson, guitarist Luke Potashnick and production duo Chris and Tony Griffiths, who co-produced the track with Mark Wallis and David Ruffy, it was featured on the band's 2005 self-titled debut album. "You're So Right for Me" was released as the third single from the album on 25 April 2005, reaching number 14 on the UK Singles Chart and number 39 on the Irish Singles Chart.

Release and reception
After its inclusion on Rooster in January 2005, "You're So Right for Me" was released as the third single from the album on 25 April 2005. It was backed with live recordings of the Cream song "Sunshine of Your Love" and the previously unreleased track "Bulletproof". The single reached number 14 on the UK Singles Chart and number 39 on the Irish Singles Chart.

In a review of the album for the website Gigwise, writer Alex Lai praised "You're So Right for Me" for "picking up the pace" after preceding track "To Die For", but concluded by claiming that it "isn't their best work".

Music video
The music video for "You're So Right for Me" was directed by Jake Nava and first aired in the week of 11 April 2005.

Track listings

Charts

References

2005 singles
Rooster (band) songs
Songs written by Nick Atkinson
Music videos directed by Jake Nava
2005 songs